Kostajnica is a village in the municipality of Doboj, Bosnia and Herzegovina.

Notable people
 Borislav Paravac (born 1943), politician and former Bosnian president
 Željko Komšić's mother Danica Stanić (1941–1992) hails from Kostajnica

References

Villages in Republika Srpska
Populated places in Doboj